Caldas de São Jorge is a former civil parish in the municipality of Santa Maria da Feira, Portugal. In 2013, the parish merged into the new parish Caldas de São Jorge e Pigeiros. It has a population of 2,728 inhabitants and a total area of 4.70 km2.

The major attraction of the town is the spa and its hotel.

References

External links
Information concerning the spa

Former parishes of Santa Maria da Feira